Nugawela Central College is a school in Kandy, Sri Lanka. It was built in 1880, becoming its current form on 4 January 1944. It was opened by former prime minister D. S. Senanayake. The school accommodates 13,200 students and provides primary and secondary education. Nugawela Central College is a school in the Kandy District and there are classes from 6 to 13. Most students enter this school by passing the grade 5 scholarship exam.

Principals
D. W Mayadunne (1944.01.01 - 1944.06.01)
M. B. S. Paleepana (1944.06.01 - 1944.11.06)
Lianal Lokuliyana (1944.11.06 - 1948.03.27)
C. L. W. Abeygunasekara	(1948.05.10 - 1953.01.29)
D. A. Devendra (1953.09.01 - 1956.05.31)
D. A. Weerasinghe (1956.07.01 - 1962.05.01)
C. Ranhoti (1962.05.01 - 1968.06.01)
K. S. Gunarathne (1968.05.01 - 1969.01.14)
D. B. Dissanayaka (1971.01.05 - 1971.01.01)
G. J. Sarathchandra (1972.01.07 - 1973.12.28)
B. Gunasekara (1974.01.01 - 1974.12.28)
T. B. Basnayaka (1974.01.01 - 1974.01.15)
G. Somapala (1974.10.18 - 1977.09.05)
R. Premarathn (1977.09.05 - 1987.01.31)
J. A. S. Jayalath (1987.09.15 - 1988.05.21)
D. M. Thilakarathne Banda (1986.02.01 - 1992.05.18)
B. A. Abeyrathne (1992.05.18 - 1997.09.17)
H. M. G. Herath (1998.03.05 - 2001.02.11)
D. A. Hettiarachchi (2001.09.29 -2010.02..)
R. P. W. K. Rajapaksha 2010.02.
T. M. S. K. Thennakoon (2017.12.08- current)

References

Educational institutions established in 1944
National schools in Sri Lanka
Schools in Kandy
1945 establishments in Ceylon